Herentals is a railway station in Herentals, Antwerp, Belgium. The station opened in 1855 and is located on Line 15 and Line 29.

Train services
The station is served by the following services:

Intercity services (IC-10) Antwerp - Mol - Hamont/Hasselt
Intercity services (IC-11) Binche - Braine-le-Comte - Halle - Brussels - Mechelen - Turnhout (weekdays)
Intercity services (IC-30) Antwerp - Herentals - Turnhout
Local services (L-24) Antwerp - Herentals - Mol (weekdays)

Bus services
The following bus services call at the station. They are operated by De Lijn.

15b (Herentals – Olen – Geel)
150 (Lier – Kessel – Nijlen – Bouwel – Herentals)
159 (Herentals – Herentals Industrie Wolfstee)
210 (Turnhout – Lille – Herentals)
212 (Turnhout – Gierle – Lichtaart – Herentals)
220 (Herentals – Hulshout – Westmeerbeek – Aarschot)
221 (Herentals – Heultje – Westmeerbeek – Houtvenne – Aarschot)
305 (Turnhout – Herentals – Herselt – Aarschot – Leuven)
418 (Antwerpen – Lille – Herentals) Express
420 (Antwerpen – Broechem – Massenhoven – Herentals)
427 (Antwerpen – Massenhoven – Herentals) Express
429 (Antwerpen – Zoersel – Malle – Lille – Herentals) Express
511 (Mechelen – Heist-op-den-Berg – Herenthout – Herentals)
540 (Westerlo – Oevel – Olen – Herentals)
541 (Westerlo – Voortkapel – Olen – Herentals)
542 (Herentals – Olen – Geel Industrie)

References

External links
 Herentals railway station at Belgian Railways website

Railway stations opened in 1855
Railway stations in Belgium
Railway stations in Antwerp Province
1855 establishments in Belgium
Herentals